RFHS can refer to:

Rock Falls High School, Rock Falls, Illinois
River Falls High School, River Falls, Wisconsin
Roaring Fork High School, Carbondale, Colorado
Rock Ferry High School, Rock Ferry, Wirral, England
Rosa Fort High School, Tunica, Mississippi